Artyom Aleksandrovich Dokuchayev (born 25 April 2001) is a Russian football player. He plays for FC Spartak Kostroma.

Club career
He made his debut in the Russian Football National League for FC Tyumen on 13 April 2019 in a game against FC Avangard Kursk.

References

External links
 
 Profile by Russian Football National League
 

2001 births
Living people
Russian footballers
Association football midfielders
FC Tyumen players
FC Spartak Kostroma players
Russian First League players
Russian Second League players